Rosetta is a city in Egypt.

Rosetta may also refer to:

Places
 Rosetta, Belfast, a ward in Northern Ireland
 Rosetta, Tasmania, a suburb of Hobart, Tasmania, Australia
 Rosetta, KwaZulu-Natal, a town in South Africa

Science and technology
 Rosetta (spacecraft), a European Space Agency-led spacecraft launched in 2004 to study comet 67P/Churyumov-Gerasimenko
 Rosetta orbit, a complex type of orbit in mathematics
 Rosetta (software), a series of binary translators developed by Apple Inc.
 Ex Libris Rosetta, digital repository software from the Ex Libris Group
 Rosetta-lang, a system-level specification language
 Rosetta Biosoftware, a subsidiary of Merck & Co.
 Rosetta Genomics, a molecular diagnostics company
 Rosetta@home, a freeware program available to help predict and design protein structures
 ROSETTA, biomolecular modeling and design software; see CS-ROSETTA
 Rosetta, a web-based translation application written by Canonical Ltd. for use on the Linux distribution Ubuntu operating system
 Rosetta, the Apple Newton's handwriting recognition system
 Rosetta, the Microsoft codename of SQL Server Reporting Services
 Rosetta Code, a wiki-based programming chrestomathy website
 Rosetta Digital Audio converters manufactured by Apogee Electronics

Entertainment
 Rosetta (band), an American post-metal band formed in 2003
 Rosetta (film), a 1999 Belgian film
 Rosetta (novel), a Star Trek: Enterprise novel
 Rosetta: The Masked Angel (Kamen Tenshi Rosetta), a Japanese toku series that aired in 1998
 "Rosetta", a jazz tune written by Earl Hines and Henri Woode 
 Rosetta, a form of latte art which resembles a flower
 Rosetta, a character in the Disney Fairies franchise
 Rosetta, the Japanese name of Rosalina, a character in the video game Super Mario Galaxy
 Rosetta Passel, a character in Kaleido Star anime series
 "Rosetta", a 1971 UK hit single by Alan Price and Georgie Fame
 Angelo Rosetta, a fictional character from the Australian soap opera Home and Away
 "Rosetta", a Season Two episode of Smallville
 Rosetta (Vangelis album), released in 2016
 Rosetta, a series of graphic novel anthologies released by Alternative Comics
 "Rosetta", a song by Don Patterson with Booker Ervin from Hip Cake Walk

People with the surname
 Virginio Rosetta (1902–1975), Italian football player

Other uses
 Rosetta (given name), a given name (including a list of people with the name)
 Rosetta (bread), an Italian bread
 Nebbiolo, an Italian wine grape also known as Rosetta

See also
 Rosetta Stone, an inscribed stone which led to the modern translation of Egyptian hieroglyphs
 Rosetta Stone (disambiguation)
 Rosetta Project, a global collaboration which collects and archives languages in danger of extinction
 HD-Rosetta, a permanent data storage device
 Hippotion rosetta, a moth species found in Asia
 Rossetta (disambiguation)
 Rosette (disambiguation)